Tremichnus is an ichnogenus or trace fossil. It is an embedment structure (i.e. bioclaustration) formed by an organism that inhibited growth of the crinoid host stereom. The most common endobiotic symbiont in Paleozoic crinoids is Tremichnus (Brett 1978, 1985)

References

 Brett C.E. 1978. Host-specific pit-forming epizoans on Silurian crinoids. Lethaia, 11, 217-232.
 Brett C.E. 1985. Tremichnus: a new ichnogenus of circular-parabolic pits in fossil echinoderms. Journal of Paleontology, 59, 625-635.

Trace fossils